Academy Hall may refer to:

Academy Hall (Rocky Hill, Connecticut), listed on the National Register of Historic Places in Hartford County, Connecticut
Academy Hall (Edinboro University of Pennsylvania), oldest building at Edinboro University of Pennsylvania and listed on the National Register of Historic Places
Academy Hall (North Yarmouth Academy), listed on the National Register of Historic Places in Yarmouth, Maine
Academy Hall, a building at Rensselaer Polytechnic Institute